Old 97's Live is a live DVD released by country/rock band Old 97's on January 25, 2005. It was recorded March 2004 at the Troubadour on Santa Monica Blvd. in Los Angeles, California. It contains songs from their entire discography, including the then-unreleased Drag It Up.

Track list
Just Like California
King of All the World
Weightless
Rollerskate Skinny
Won't Be Home
Smokers
Melt Show
Wish the Worst
Lonely Holiday
Up the Devil's Pay
Friends Forever
New Kid
Jagged
Four Leaf Clover
Question
Valentine
Murder (Or a Heart Attack)
Doreen
Big Brown Eyes
Time Bomb

Old 97's albums
Live video albums
2005 video albums
2005 live albums
Albums recorded at the Troubadour